Megalomyrmex wallacei is a Neotropical species of ants in the subfamily Myrmicinae. Megalomyrmex wallacei can be found in Brazil (Amazonas, Rondônia, Pará, Tocantins), Guyana, Colombia, Costa Rica. This species occurs in mature wet forest, usually low-elevation rainforest. Brandão (2003) reports the species nesting under leaves on the forest floor, in colonies of up to 300 workers.

References

Myrmicinae
Insects described in 1916
Hymenoptera of South America
Hymenoptera of North America